Whore is a 2008 drama film co-starring, edited, written, produced and directed by Thomas Dekker. It stars Megan Fox, Thomas Dekker, Ron Jeremy, Rumer Willis, Lauren Storm, and Lena Headey. It was released on October 20, 2008.

Cast 
Thomas Dekker as Tom
Rumer Willis as Smoking Girl
Ron Jeremy as The Priest
Johanna Braddy as Margot
Anthony Fitzgerald as Michael
Brad Rowe as John
Lauren Storm as Lauren
Aram Rappaport as Mike
Hilary Alexander as Mother
Jessica Amento as Jessica
Ken Baumann as Kenny (as Kenny Baumann)
Kelly Blatz as Rapper #2
Aria Noelle Curzon as Desert Ghost
David Dekker as Jean-Luc the Great
Danny Dubiel as Bull's Eye
Edmund Entin as Edmund
Gary Entin as The Fairy
Kyle Farris as The Starving Ethiopian Child
Megan Fox as Lost
Sydney Freggiaro as Petty Woman
Justin Hanlon as Justin
Lena Headey as Mom
Jason Merrell as Jason
Elyte Salna as Rebecca
Dan Studney as Cherry Poppin' Daddy

External links
 

2008 films
American comedy-drama films
American teen drama films
2008 comedy-drama films
2008 directorial debut films
2000s English-language films
2000s American films